The 1973 Cleveland Tennis Classic, also known as the Cleveland WCT, was a men's tennis tournament held on indoor carpet courts in Cleveland, Ohio in the United States that was part of the Group B circuit of the World Championship Tennis. It was the second edition of the tournament and was held between the April 9 and April 15, 1973. Fifth-seeded Ken Rosewall won the singles title and earned $10,000 first-prize money as well as 10 WCT ranking points.

Finals

Singles
 Ken Rosewall defeated  Roger Taylor 6–3, 6–4
 It was Rosewall's 2nd singles title of the year and the 30th of his career in the Open Era.

Doubles
 Ken Rosewall /  Fred Stolle defeated  Ismail El Shafei /  Brian Fairlie 6–2, 6–3

References

External links
 ITF tournament edition details

Cleveland WCT
Cleveland WCT
Cleveland WCT
Cleveland WCT
Tennis in Cleveland